Mauritania competed in the Olympic Games for the first time at the 1984 Summer Olympics in Los Angeles, United States.

Wrestling 

Men's freestyle

References
Official Olympic Reports

Nations at the 1984 Summer Olympics
1984
Oly